The English Phonotypic Alphabet is a phonetic alphabet developed by Sir Isaac Pitman and Alexander John Ellis originally as an English language spelling reform. Although never gaining wide acceptance, elements of it were incorporated into the modern International Phonetic Alphabet.

It was originally published in June 1845. Subsequently, adaptations were published which extended the alphabet to the German, Arabic, Spanish, Tuscan, French, Welsh, Italian, Dutch, Polish, Portuguese and Sanskrit languages.

Letters
The letters are as follows (with some approximations to accommodate Unicode)

Late 1843 (English)
At this stage, long vowels had a cross-bar, and short vowels did not

Long vowels
Ɨ /iː/, E /eɪ/, A /ɑː/, Ɵ /ɔː/, Ʉ /oʊ/?, ꭐ-bar /uː/

Short vowels
I /ɪ/, ⵎ /ɛ/, Ʌ /æ/, O /ɒ/, U /ʌ/, ꭐ /ʊ/

(a proper  was taller and without the dot, like  but with the middle stem not so tall as the others, and did not have a serif at the bottom right)

Diphthongs
Ɯ /juː/, ⅄ /aɪ/, Ȣ /aʊ/?

Reduced ('obscure') vowels
Ǝ /ə/, ⵎ /ᵊ/

Consonants
P B, T D, Є J /tʃ dʒ/, K G

F V, Θ Δ /θ ð/, S Z, Σ Σ /ʃ ʒ/,

L R, M N, И /ŋ/, Y W H.

_a /eɪ/
(Ā)ᶐ /ɑː/
Ɵɵ /ɔː/
_ɷ /oʊ/
Ɯɯ /uː/
Ii /ɪ/
Ee /ɛ/
Aɑ /æ/
Oo /ɒ/
Uu /ʌ/
_(ꭐ)
_ᶙ /juː/
Yy /j/
Ww /w/
Hh /h/
Pp /p/
Bb /b/
Tt /t/
Dd /d/
Єꞔ /tʃ/
Jj /dʒ/
Cc /k/
Gg /ɡ/
Ff /f/
Vv /v/
Ꞁ(ⱦ) /θ/
Ƌ(đ) /ð/
Ss /s/
Zz /z/
Σʃ /ʃ/
(Ʒ)ʒ /ʒ/
Rr /r/
Ll /l/
Mm /m/
Nn /n/
(Ŋ)ŋ /ŋ/

References

See also 
 The Phonetic Journal

External links 
 Third Revised Proposal to encode characters for the English Phonotypic Alphabet (EPA) in the UCS, October 18th 2011  
 Completion of the Phonotypic Alphabet
 Extension of the Phonotypic Alphabet

1845 introductions
Writing systems introduced in the 19th century
Phonics
Phonetic alphabets
English spelling reform
Reading (process)